Timothy Austin (born April 14, 1971) is an American former professional boxer. He is now a coach at the Cincinnati Golden Gloves gym in Cincinnati.

Amateur career
Austin had an outstanding amateur career, compiling a record of 113-9.

Amateur accomplishments 
 1990 National Golden Gloves flyweight champion
 1991 National Golden Gloves flyweight champion
 1991 United States Amateur flyweight champion
 Representing the United States, Austin won a bronze medal as a flyweight at the 1992 Barcelona Olympics. His results were:
 1st round bye
 Defeated Yuliyan Strogov (Bulgaria) 19-7
 Defeated Benjamin Mwangata (Tanzania) 19-8
 Lost to Raúl González (Cuba) RSC 1

Professional career
Known as "Cincinnati Kid", Austin won the IBF Bantamweight title by defeating Mbulelo Botile in 1997. He successfully defended his title against nine fighters before losing to Rafael Marquez by an 8th-round technical knockout in 2003.

Legal troubles
Shortly after the loss to Marquez, Austin was accused, and later acquitted, of raping a 16-year-old girl.   With his legal troubles behind him, Austin resumed his career in 2005 but his comeback was quickly derailed when he lost via TKO to journeyman Eric Aiken, who went on to win the IBF Bantamweight Title.

Austin had another run in with the law in January 2008.  He was arrested and charged with domestic violence after allegedly threatening to kill his wife, and for kicking and punching her about the face.

References

External links
 

1971 births
Living people
Boxers from Cincinnati
Bantamweight boxers
Boxers at the 1992 Summer Olympics
Olympic bronze medalists for the United States in boxing
World boxing champions
World bantamweight boxing champions
International Boxing Federation champions
Southpaw boxers
National Golden Gloves champions
Winners of the United States Championship for amateur boxers
People acquitted of rape
American male boxers
African-American boxers
Medalists at the 1992 Summer Olympics